Infantilism may refer to:

In psychology
Paraphilic infantilism, a paraphilia involving the desire to wear diapers and/or fantasies of a return to infancy 
Psychosexual infantilism, a concept in psychosexual development introduced by Sigmund Freud
In a more general sense and in colloquial expressions – childlike behavior in adults, particularly lack of judgement and poor ability to make conclusions based on logical reasoning as well as actions driven more by immediate impressions and impulses rather than by rationale. Depending on degree of expression can range from mental disorder, to behavioral disorder or simply psychological makeup and personality trait of otherwise healthy person.     

In medicine
Infantilism (physiological disorder) obsolete use of the term for some developmental disorders and disabilities
Infantilism, also known as infantile speech, a speech disorder in which early speech stages persist beyond the age they are normally expected to fade
Hypothalamic infantilism-obesity, or sexual infantilism, synonyms for adiposogenital dystrophy

See also
 Delayed puberty, delayed sexual development symptomatic of several medical syndromes
 Diaper fetishism, a paraphilic attraction to wearing diapers which does not involve fantasies of childlike behavior
 Paternalism, deliberate limiting of the autonomy of others